Disco Connection is the eighth studio album by American soul musician Isaac Hayes. The album, credited to his backing band, The Isaac Hayes Movement, was released in 1975. The album debuted at number 85 on the Billboard 200.

Track listing
All tracks composed and arranged by Isaac Hayes

Personnel
Isaac Hayes - vocals, keyboards, synthesizer
Charles Pitts, Michael Toles, William Vaughn, Anthony Shinault - guitar
Errol Thomas - bass guitar
Lester Snell - keyboards, arrangements
Sidney Kirk - keyboards
Willie Hall, Willie Coles - drums, tambourine
Jimmy Lee Thompson - congas
Darnell Smith, Tommy Williams - tenor saxophone
Bill Easely, Emerson Able - alto saxophone
Floyd Newman - baritone saxophone
Ben Cauley, Edgar Matthews, Johnny Davis, William Taylor - trumpet, flugelhorn
Bill Flores, Jackie Thomas - trombone
Gary Russell - bass trombone
Bryant Munch, Richard Dolph - French horn
The Memphis Strings - strings

References

1975 albums
Isaac Hayes albums
Albums produced by Isaac Hayes
ABC Records albums